Henrique da Silva Coutinho was the fourth president (governor) of the Brazilian state of Espírito Santo.  He was appointed for the function by the President of Brazil, Marshall Manuel Deodoro da Fonseca, and governed the state from November 20, 1890 to March 11, 1891.

He had a second term as governor of Espirito Santo, from June 16, 1904 to May 23, 1908, now elected by the people.

Governors of Espírito Santo
Year of death missing
Year of birth missing